The 1919 All-Ireland Senior Hurling Championship Final was the 32nd All-Ireland Final and the culmination of the 1919 All-Ireland Senior Hurling Championship, an inter-county hurling tournament for the top teams in Ireland. The match was held at Croke Park, Dublin, on 21 September 1919, between Cork, represented by a selection of club players, and Dublin, represented by club side Collegians. The Leinster champions lost to their Munster opponents on a score line of 6-4 to 2-4.

The Cork goals were scored by Connie Lucey, John Barry-Murphy and Jimmy Kennedy who all scored two goals apiece.

Match details

1
All-Ireland Senior Hurling Championship Finals
Cork county hurling team matches
Dublin GAA matches
All-Ireland Senior Hurling Championship Final
All-Ireland Senior Hurling Championship Final, 1919